Mario Lopez: Saved by the Baby is an American reality television series on VH1 that debuted on November 1, 2010. The series chronicles the life of Mario Lopez and his girlfriend Courtney Mazza as they prepare for the arrival of their baby.

Episodes

References

2010 American television series debuts
2011 American television series endings
2010s American reality television series
English-language television shows
VH1 original programming
Television series by 3 Arts Entertainment
Television series by 51 Minds Entertainment